McCollough is a surname. Notable people with the surname include:

Aaron McCollough (born 1971), American poet
Celeste McCollough, American scientist
Evan McCollough (born 1987), American player of Canadian footballer
Jack McCollough (born 1978), Fashion Designer
W. Alan McCollough (born 1950), American businessman

See also
McCullagh
MacCulloch
McCulloch
McCullough
McCollough effect, an optical illusion, named after Celeste McCollough